The Łódź Dąbrowa is a railway complex in Polish city of Łódź, located in the Górna district, between the residential and industrial sectors of the Dąbrowa estate, on the part of circular line running between Łódź Chojny and Łódź Widzew stations. The complex consists of two parts: a cargo terminal serving the industrial facilities located in the areas of Dąbrowa, Zarzew and Widzew Wschód, and a pass-through commuter station, consisting of a single platform located under the viaducts of Dąbrowski St.

The station was planned back in the 1960s because of the construction of towerblock estate to the west of the tracks. The passenger station was meant to be built along with road viaducts, but the work was never finished. An unfinished concourse under the viaduct is the only remnant of that era.

The concept of a commuter station was reactivated in 2010 as part of the Łódź Commuter Railway project. A new platform was made, along with staircases and elevators for both road viaducts for integration with a bus stop located on them. The new station was opened on 15 December 2013.

The station is mostly served by PolRegio regional trains running from Łódź Kaliska station to Częstochowa and Skarżysko-Kamienna, and ŁKA trains from Łódź Kaliska to Łódź Widzew station. The station is also served by several PKP Intercity trains from Warsaw to Wrocław.

The station can be accessed by trams running to a nearby terminus, and buses, both terminating at and passing through the area of the station.

Train services
The station is served by the following services:

 InterRegio services (IR) Łódź Kaliska — Warszawa Glowna 
 InterRegio services (IR) Ostrów Wielkopolski — Łódź — Warszawa Główna
 InterRegio services (IR) Poznań Główny — Ostrów Wielkopolski — Łódź — Warszawa Główna
 Regional services (PR) Łódź Kaliska — Skarżysko-Kamienna

References 

Railway stations in Poland opened in 2013
Dąbrowa
Railway stations served by Łódzka Kolej Aglomeracyjna